Thomas Kaminsky may refer to:

Thomas Kaminski (born 1992), Belgian footballer
Thomas Kaminsky (artist) (born 1945), German artist